Citizen is an American rock band from Southeast Michigan and Northwest Ohio that formed in 2009. The band consists of three core members: Mat Kerekes (vocals) and brothers Nick Hamm (lead guitar), & Eric Hamm (bass). They are currently signed to Run for Cover Records, and have released four studio albums to date: Youth (2013), Everybody Is Going to Heaven (2015), As You Please (2017) and Life in Your Glass World (2021). Considered a part of emo's fourth wave, Pitchfork have described Citizen as "a band their fans can grow up with rather than out of."

History

Formation and early releases (2009–2012)
Mat Kerekes first formed the band in 2009 after departing as the drummer from his previous band, The Sound of Glory. The Sound of Glory was a metalcore band that had a large local following as well as somewhat of a regional following during their years of existence. This band included additional members of Citizen, Nick Hamm and Eric Hamm, on their same respective instruments. Additional members of the band were vocalist Josh Childress (guitarist of The Plot in You) and a second guitarist to The Sound of Glory, Joey Chester. The early material of Citizen displayed a melodic hardcore sound much unlike their present day music. The band released their first demo shortly after formation. Citizen played their first show on January 28, 2010 at Frankie's Inner City in Toledo, Ohio where they opened for Set Your Goals.

In May 2011, the band made an appearance at Bled Fest. The band also released a split EP with The Fragile Season, titled The Only Place I Know.

After signing with Run For Cover Records in March 2012, Citizen began recording a Split EP with labelmates Turnover. Run For Cover Records states that this Split marks growth and maturity for both bands as they go from up and coming locals to established national artists. After the release of Citizen and Turnover's split EP on May 22, 2012, Citizen and Turnover went on a summer tour, along with the band Light Years.

In September 2011, Citizen released an EP titled Young States which was then reissued the following year in September 2012 by Run for Cover Records. Shortly after the reissue of Young States Citizen went on a supporting tour with bands Aficionado and Mixtapes, followed by a tour with Such Gold, Mixtapes, and Raindance. Finally, Citizen went on a brief fall headlining tour with State Champs and Candy Hearts as supporting acts.

Youth (2013–2014) 
In February 2013, Citizen began recording their debut studio album Youth in studio 4 with producer Will Yip and released Youth on June 11, 2013. Youth features ten tracks along with a bonus acoustic version of their song "How Does It Feel?" In an interview with Beyond the Pit Press, when asked how Citizen came up with the title of their album, guitarist Nick Hamm stated that Youth is a coming of age record. After the Release of Youth Citizen played on the 2013 Vans Warped Tour. Following the Vans Warped tour Citizen played a record release show for Youth in their Hometown of Toledo, OH. In June 2014, the band announced they would be going on a fall tour in support of Youth, starting early September in Toronto, Canada, and ending mid-October in Cleveland, Ohio. The tour was supported by the bands You Blew It!, Hostage Calm, Praise, and True Love.

Everybody Is Going to Heaven (2015–2016) 
On April 26, 2015 Citizen announced plans to release their second full-length album, Everybody Is Going to Heaven, on June 23, 2015 via Run For Cover. Before the release of the album, Citizen premiered a music video for their song Stain which appears on the album. The album was made available for streaming via Run for Cover's Bandcamp page on June 9, 2015. The album charted at number 2 on the Billboard Vinyl Albums chart.

As You Please (2017–2020) 
During October 2017 Citizen released their third album, As You Please, with Run For Cover Records. Soon after the release of their third album Citizen began the As You Please Tour, accompanied by Sorority Noise and Great Grandpa.

In 2018 the band embarked on a tour in support of The Story So Far along with Turnover and Movements.

By the end of 2019, the band had material written for a fourth album. Recording took place in Toledo, Ohio during the winter of 2019–2020.

Life in Your Glass World (2021–present) 
On January 11, 2021, the band announced their fourth full-length album, Life in Your Glass World (on Run For Cover Records) and released the lead single, "I Want to Kill You". Shortly thereafter, the second and third singles, Blue Sunday and Black and Red, were released on digital streaming services. On March 26, 2021, Life in Your Glass World was released.

Style
AllMusic biographer Jason Lymangrover who called the band's sound a merge of "bombastic emo pop, post-hardcore, and thick, chunky indie rock". The band has been described as indie rock. Youth has been described as emo, pop punk, post-hardcore, and punk rock. Everybody Is Going to Heaven has been described as alternative rock, emo, and shoegaze. Citizen has been described as a number of genres but in a 2013 interview with Cosmos Gaming, guitar player Nick Hamm states that while people are right to assign those genres to their band he views Citizen as being simply a rock band.

Concert tours 
 Youth Record Release Show (2013)
 Citizen Fall Tour (2014)
 Citizen/Turnover Co-Headlining Tour (2016)
 As You Please Tour (2017)
Citizen/Knuckle Puck Co-Headlining Tour (2019)

Discography
Studio albums
Youth (2013)
Everybody Is Going to Heaven (2015)
As You Please (2017)
Life in Your Glass World (2021)

Extended plays
Young States (2011)

Splits
The Only Place I Know (split w/ The Fragile Season) (2011)
Citizen / Turnover (split w/ Turnover) (2012)

Singles
"Silo" (2014)
"Nail in Your Hand" (2015)
"Jet" (2017)
"Open Your Heart" (2018)
"Big Mouth" (2019)
"Clox" (2020)
"I Want to Kill You" (2021)
"Blue Sunday" (2021)
"Black and Red" (2021)
"Bash Out" (2022)

Other releases
Demo (2009)

Band members
Current members
Mat Kerekes – lead vocals (2009–present), sampler, keyboards (2017–present), drums (2019–present)
Nick Hamm – lead guitar, backing vocals (2009–present), rhythm guitar (2020–present)
Eric Hamm – bass (2009–present)

Current touring musicians
Ben Russin – drums (2021–present)
Mason Mercer – rhythm guitar (2021–present)

Former members
Ryland Oehlers – rhythm guitar, backing vocals (2009–2020; occasional session and touring musician 2021–present)
Mike Armstrong – drums (2009–2012)
Cray Wilson – drums (2012–2014)
Jake Duhaime – drums (2014–2019)
Ronnie Farris – drums (2021, touring)

Timeline

References

External links
Official website
Run For Cover Records artist page

Rock music groups from Michigan
Rock music groups from Ohio
Run for Cover Records artists
Emo revival groups
American emo musical groups